Pat Steir (born 1940) is an American painter and printmaker. Her early work was loosely associated with conceptual art and minimalism, however, she is best known for her abstract dripped, splashed and poured "Waterfall" paintings, which she started in the 1980s, and for her later site-specific wall drawings.

Steir has had retrospectives and exhibitions all over the world, including the Tate Gallery in London, and shows at the Brooklyn Museum and the New Museum of Contemporary Art that traveled throughout Europe. She has won numerous awards for her work, and is thoroughly represented in major museum collections in the United States and abroad, including the Metropolitan Museum of Art and the Museum of Modern Art in New York City and the Tate Gallery. She is a founding board member of Printed Matter bookshop in New York City, and of the landmark feminist journal, Heresies, first published in 1977.  Steir has also taught art at Parsons School of Design, Princeton University and Hunter College. She has lived and worked primarily in New York City as an adult.  She lives in Greenwich Village.

Early life and education
Steir was born Iris Patricia Sukoneck in 1940 in Newark, New Jersey. She attended the Pratt Institute in New York (1956–1958), where she was influenced by her teachers Richard Lindner and Phillip Guston, and Boston University College of Fine Arts (1958–1960). Steir returned to Pratt and earned a BFA degree in 1962.

Career

Early years

In 1962, the year she graduated from art school, Steir was included in a group show at the High Museum of Art in Atlanta, Georgia. In 1964, her work was in a show called “Drawings” at the Museum of Modern Art in New York. Her first one-person exhibition was at the Terry Dintenfass Gallery, New York, in 1964. During that time, she worked in New York as an illustrator and a book designer (1962–1966). Between 1966–1969, Steir was an art director at Harper & Row publishing company, New York. Around 1970 she became friends with Sol LeWitt, Lawrence Weiner, and other conceptual artists, and she made the first of many trips to New Mexico to visit Agnes Martin.

She rose to fame in the 1970s with monochromatic canvases of roses and other images that were X-ed out.  The artist explained, “I wanted to destroy images as symbols. To make the image a symbol for a symbol.  I had to act it out―make the image and cross it out. …no imagery, but at the same time endless imagery. Every nuance of paint texture worked as an image.” Nothing from 1974, in the collection of the Honolulu Museum of Art, is an example of this phase of the artist's work.

Mature work

Steir's first museum exhibition, in 1973 at the Corcoran Gallery of Art, Washington, D.C., marks the beginning of a career dense with painting exhibitions. She has also made installation work (shown at Documenta IX, Kassel, Germany, in 1992) and is an important printmaker. Crown Point Press began publishing her prints in 1977 and in 1983 the Spencer Museum of Art, University of Kansas, gave her a print and drawing exhibition. A print retrospective at the Cabinet des Estampes in Geneva traveled to the Tate Gallery in London, England. Steir has had one-person painting exhibitions at the Brooklyn Museum in 1984 and the New Museum of Contemporary Art in New York in 1987, both of which traveled to other museums, many in Europe.

In the late 1980s, Steir became influenced by the artists John Cage and Agnes Martin and began producing dripped, splashed and poured works, embracing the element of chance. The artist relates this work to the 8th and 9th century Chinese Yipin "ink-splashing" painters, having studied ink splash in the harmony of nature and humanity, inspired by Tibetan philosophy. Wind and Water is an example of this phase of her work. In 1989–92 Steir began limiting her colors to monochrome. In 1995, the monograph Pat Steir was published by the American art critic Thomas McEvilley, chronicling the artists' life work up to that point. In November 1999, Steir was the subject of an Art in America cover feature, "Watercourse Way," by critic G. Roger Denson, who wrote that Steir's lyrical waterfall paintings attest to her long-standing interest in Asian art and thought, particularly the ancient Chinese philosophy of Daoism, with Steir's literal and figurative motif embodying the flow of water (or in her case, paint) down a surface.

Describing Steir's 2010 installation at Sue Scott Gallery, The Nearly Endless Line, which consisted of a white line snaking around the gallery's blue-black walls, lit with blue light, Sharon Butler writes in The Brooklyn Rail, "Walking through the darkened space, observers find themselves inside Steir’s painting, where they become part of the illusion she has created with paint and light." Pat Steir said "I wanted to be a great artist, again not in slang in someone who is great. But in the fantastic, reaching the soul of other people."

Awards
Steir has received many public honors for her work. She was the recipient of Individual Artist (1973) and Art in Public Institutions (1976) grants from the National Endowment for the Arts, and was awarded a Guggenheim Fellowship for Fine Arts in 1982. Both of her alma maters have recognized her: Pratt, with an Honorary Doctorate of Fine Art (1991) and a 2008 Alumni Achievement Award for “outstanding graduates who have distinguished themselves in their fields," and Boston University, with a Distinguished Alumni Award (2001). In 2016, Steir was elected a member of the American Academy of Arts and Letters.

Exhibitions

In a career spanning over fifty years, Steir has exhibited at a large number of galleries and institutions, throughout the U.S. and internationally. Selected galleries where she has had solo exhibitions include: Terry Dintenfass Gallery, Max Protech Gallery, Crown Point Press, M. Knoedler & Co., Victoria Miro Gallery, Robert Miller Gallery, Cheim & Read, Locks Gallery, and Lévy Gorvy.

Selected museums and institutions that have held retrospectives and exhibitions of her work include: Ball State University, Corcoran Gallery of Art (1973); Spencer Museum of Art, Contemporary Arts Museum, Houston (1983); Brooklyn Museum (1984); Cincinnati Art Museum, Philadelphia College of Art (1985); Museum of Fine Arts Bern, The New Museum of Contemporary Art, The Baltimore Museum of Art (1987); Musée d'art contemporain de Lyon (1990); and the Rhode Island School of Design Museum (2010).

Silent Secret Waterfalls: The Barnes Series, Barnes Foundation, 2019.
Pat Steir: Color Wheel, the Hirshhorn Museum and Sculpture Garden, 2019.

Collections
Steir’s work is included in major public collections around the world, including:  Metropolitan Museum of Art (New York City); Museum of Modern Art, Whitney Museum of American Art, Solomon R. Guggenheim Museum (New York City), National Gallery of Art (Washington, D. C.), Tate Gallery (London), Honolulu Museum of Art, Walker Art Center, San Francisco Museum of Modern Art, and Contemporary Museum, Honolulu.

References

Bibliography
 Steir, Pat, Pat Steir paintings, New York, Abrams, 1986.
 Steir, Pat, Arbitrary Order, Paintings by Pat Steir, Contemporary Arts Museum, Houston, Texas, 1983.
 Steir, Pat, Dazzling Water, Dazzling Light, Seattle, University of Washington Press, 2000.
 McEvilley, Thomas, "Pat Steir", New York, Harry N. Abrams, 1995.
 Denson, G. Roger, "Watercourse Way," Art in America, November 1999, pp. 114–121, with a painting by Steir appearing on the front cover.

External links
Video Interview with Pat Steir at Crown Point Press 
Locks Gallery, Pat Steir
 Pat Steir at AWARE
Oral history interview with Pat Steir, 2008 March 1-2, Archives of American Art, Smithsonian Institution

1940 births
Living people
Artists from Newark, New Jersey
Pratt Institute alumni
20th-century American painters
21st-century American painters
American abstract artists
Painters from New York City
Painters from New Jersey
20th-century American women artists
American women printmakers
21st-century American women artists
20th-century American printmakers
American women painters
People from Greenwich Village
Heresies Collective members
Members of the American Academy of Arts and Letters